In astrophysics, the Darwin–Radau equation (named after Rodolphe Radau and Charles Galton Darwin) gives an approximate relation between the moment of inertia factor of a planetary body and its rotational speed and shape.  The moment of inertia factor is directly related to the largest principal moment of inertia, C.  It is assumed that the rotating body is in hydrostatic equilibrium and is an ellipsoid of revolution.  The Darwin–Radau equation states

where M and Re represent the mass and mean equatorial radius of the body.  Here λ is the d'Alembert parameter and the Radau parameter η is defined as

where q is the geodynamical constant

and ε is the geometrical flattening

where Rp is the mean polar radius and Re is the mean equatorial radius.

References

Astrophysics
Planetary science
Equations of astronomy